Christoph Walther (born 9 August 1950)
is a German computer scientist, known for his contributions to automated theorem proving.
He is Professor emeritus at Darmstadt University of Technology.

Selected publications

On automated program termination analysis

On the VeriFun verification system for functional programs

On order-sorted resolution

On induction proving

References

External links
 Christoph Walther's home page at Darmstadt University

1950 births
Living people
German computer scientists
Technische Universität Darmstadt alumni
Karlsruhe Institute of Technology alumni